Zasukhin (from , drought) is a Russian male surname, its feminine counterpart is Zasukhina. Notable people with the surname include:

 Aleksandr Zasukhin (born 1928), Soviet Olympic boxer
 Aleksei Zasukhin (born 1937), Soviet boxer

Russian-language surnames